Bigg Boss 2 is the second season of the Indian reality TV programme Bigg Boss. It began airing on 21 August 2008 on Colors TV. The housemates, considered strangers to each other, spent 98 days locked up together under one roof under the 24×7 supervision of 32 cameras fitted around the Bigg Boss house.

On the second day of the show, the British guest on exchange in the house, Jade Goody, walked out of the Bigg Boss house due to the revelation that she had developed cancer. On Day 30 of the show, an additional entry to the house was made in the form of Diana Hayden, who was the fifteenth contestant of the reality game show. The show topped the rating charts in its last week due to a voluntary exit by a popular housemate, Rahul Mahajan.

The season lasted for 98 continuous days in total, ending with the finale on 22 November 2008. Ashutosh Kaushik emerged as the winner with an award of Rs. 1 crore. Raja Chaudhary was the runner-up of the show. Rahul Mahajan won the Aveo UVA car as he was selected as the Bada Dilwala of the show.

Housemates Rahul Mahajan and Sambhavana Sheth returned to compete in Bigg Boss Halla Bol. They became the third and fourth housemates to be evicted, on Day 21 and 24 respectively. Mahahjan again returned as a challenger in Bigg Boss 14.

Production 

The show is based on the Big Brother format developed by John de Mol. A number of contestants (known as "housemates") lived in a purpose-built house and were isolated from the rest of the world. Each week, housemates nominated two of their peers for eviction, and the housemates who received the most nominations would face a public vote. Of these, one would eventually leave, having been "evicted" from the House. However, there were exceptions to this process as dictated by Bigg Boss. In the final week, there were three housemates remaining, and the public voted for who they wanted to win.

Tasks were set by Bigg Boss each week. The housemates were allowed to gamble on task outcomes and were rewarded with extra money to order more supplies if they won.

Housemates status

Housemates

Original Entrants
The participants in the order of appearance and entrance in the house are:
Monica Bedi – Actress. She is a former starlet and the widow of underworld don Abu Salem. She appeared in movies like Jodi No. 1, Jaanam Samjha Karo and Pyaar Ishq Aur Mohabbat.
Debojit Saha – Singer. He participated and became the winner of Zee TV's singing reality show Sa Re Ga Ma Pa Challenge 2005.
Sambhavana Seth – Actress and Item girl.
Rakhi Vijan – Actress She is known for her roles in the show Hum Paanch and the film Golmaal Returns.
Rahul Mahajan – Political leader. He is a former pilot and the only son of politician Pramod Mahajan.  He was reportedly admitted to a hospital for drugs overdose right after his father's death in May 2006. In a more recent controversy, his newly wedded wife Shweta claimed that she was being abused by Rahul. In August 2008, two weeks before him joining Bigg Boss they got divorced.
Payal Rohatgi – Model and actress. She has appeared in films like Yeh Kya Ho Raha Hai?, 36 China Town and Heyy Babyy.
Sanjay Nirupam – Politician. He is a politician and a member of the Congress (I) Party.
Zulfi Syed – Model and actor. He starred in Akbar Khan's Taj Mahal and the controversial movie "Deshdrohi". Zulfi also played small roles in other Bollywood movies. 
Raja Chaudhary – Actor. He has appeared in many Bhojpuri films. He was in a controversial relationship with Shweta Tiwari whom he later divorced.
Ashutosh Kaushik – Model and Reality TV star. He participated and became the winner of MTV Roadies in 2007.
Ahsaan Qureshi – Stand-up comedian. He participated in the reality show The Great Indian Laughter Challenge and became a finalist.
Ketaki Dave – Television actress. She is popular for her role of Daksha Virani in Ekta Kapoor's show Kyunki Saas Bhi Kabhi Bahu Thi.
Elina Wadiwala – Model.
Jade Goody – British television personality. She participated in the reality show Big Brother UK 3 (2002). She later participated in Celebrity Big Brother in its fifth season where she was in an international racist controversy after she bullied fellow housemate Shilpa Shetty, along with two other contestants Danielle Lloyd and Jo O'Meara. She died in March 2009 due to cervical cancer.

Wild card entrants
Diana Hayden – Model. She became the winner of Miss World and runner up of Miss India in 1997.

Guests 
Sana Wadiwala
Abhishek Bachchan
Ravi Kishan
Akshay Kumar
Karisma Kapoor
Geeta Kapoor
Sonu Nigam

Weekly summary

Nominations table

  indicates that the Housemate was directly nominated for eviction.
  indicates that the Housemate was immune prior to nominations.
  indicates the winner.
  indicates the first runner up.
  indicates the second runner up.
  indicates the third runner up.
  indicates the contestant has been evicted.
  indicates the contestant walked out due to emergency.
  indicates the contestant has been ejected.
  house captain.
  indicates the contestant is nominated.

Nomination notes

References 

02
2008 Indian television seasons